Antonia Wright (born 1979) is a Cuban-American artist born in Miami, Florida. Through a multidisciplinary practice of video, performance, installation , sculpture, sound, and light, Wright responds to extremes of emotion, control, and violence as they relate to systems of power in society. Alpesh Kantilal Patel of Artforum wrote of her work, “the body is the true medium she explores.” 

In 2022, she was named one of “11 Artists Leading the Country's Cultural Conversation Right Now”  by Gotham Magazine for her work addressing social issues.

Background and education
Antonia Wright received an MFA in Poetry from The New School in 2005 and trained at the International Center of Photography in New York City graduating in 2008.

Wright serves on the boards of Planned Parenthood North, South and East Florida, The Lotus House Shelter, and Locust Projects.

Awards 
In 2022, during Miami Art Week, Antonia Wright along with her long-time collaborator, Ruben Millares, were the winners of the No Vacancy Juror’s Choice Award for their public artwork installed on the beach outside the Faena Hotel.

Wright recently won the Ellies 2022 Creator Award, was named a 2021 CINTAS Foundation Fellowship finalist awarded to artists with Cuban heritage, and won a 2019-2020 South Florida Cultural Consortium Award. She has been featured in New York Magazine's article, "The New Talent Show: Pot-Luck Culture"  on the burgeoning salon scene in New York City.

In the fall of 2015, Wright was an artist-in-residence at Pioneer Works, in Red Hook, Brooklyn.

Career 
Her solo show “I came to see the damage that was done and the treasures that prevail” at Spinello Projects, Miami, Florida in 2022 was a reaction to the reproductive rights crisis.

In 2021, Wright debuted “Not Yet Paved” at Pérez Art Museum Miami, Florida, where she converted a concrete mixer truck into a musical instrument that plays the song "Young, Latin, and Proud" by the musician Helado Negro.

In 2013, Wright created "Be" a video showing the artist covered in 15,000 bees while practicing the movements of tai chi. During Art Basel Miami (2013), Wright threw herself through sheets of glass in "Suddenly We Jumped (Breaking the Glass Ceiling)" at Vizcaya Museum and Gardens inspired by the movement of Futurism.

In April 2012, Wright established an artist-in-residence program at Lotus House Shelter, in Miami, Florida. The artist lived there for one month.

Since 2009, Wright has been performing an ongoing piece entitled "Are You OK?" wherein she goes into the streets of various cities and cries while capturing the responses of those passing by.

She exhibited the video "Under the Water Was Sand, Then Rocks, Miles of Rocks then Fire" with Luis De Jesus Los Angeles depicting the artist walking on and falling into a frozen lake.

Select group exhibitions include “You Know Who You Are: Recent Acquisitions of Cuban Art from the Jorge M Pérez Collection,” El Espacio 23, Miami, FL (2023), “Sinking Feeling” at Or Gallery in Vancouver, Canada (2023), “On the Horizon" at The Frist Art Museum in Nashville, Tennessee (2022), “#fail” at the Contemporary Art Center in New Orleans, Louisiana (2022), “Counter-Landscapes”, Scottsdale Museum of Contemporary Art, Arizona (2019), “Energy Charge: Connecting to Ana Mendieta” at ASU Art Museum.

Wright's work is in the permanent collection of Martin Z. Margulies,  El Espacio 23, The Lotus House Shelter, Pérez Art Museum Miami, The Bass Museum of Art in Miami Beach, and NSU Art Museum in Ft. Lauderdale.

She has received reviews in the New York Times and Artforum.

Wright is represented by Spinello Projects.

References

1979 births
Living people
21st-century American women artists
Artists from Miami
American installation artists
American video artists
American performance artists
University of Montana alumni
The New School alumni